United Ground also known as TrustCo United Sports Field is a cricket ground in Windhoek, Namibia.  The first recorded match on the ground was in 1990 when Namibia played the Netherlands.

The ground held its first List A match in the 2001/02 6 Nations Challenge when Kenya played Zimbabwe A.  To date the ground has held 12 List A matches.  In 2005, the ground held its first first-class match between Namibia and Bermuda in the 2005 Intercontinental Cup.  The ground held a second first-class match in 2010 between Namibia and Uganda in the 2009-10 Intercontinental Shield.

List of Centuries

Twenty20 International Centuries

This is the list of centuries scored in Twenty20 Internationals at the venue

References

External links
United Ground, Windhoek at CricketArchive

Cricket grounds in Namibia
Buildings and structures in Windhoek